Mahmmoud Qandil (born 11 August 1988) is an Israeli professional footballer playing for Bnei Sakhnin in the Israeli Premier League.

Early life
Kanadil was born in Jadeidi-Makr, Israel, to a Muslim-Arab family.

References

1988 births
Living people
Israeli footballers
Arab-Israeli footballers
Arab citizens of Israel
Bnei Sakhnin F.C. players
Liga Leumit players
Israeli Premier League players
Footballers from Jadeidi-Makr
Association football goalkeepers
Israeli Muslims